The Cadet Training Centre (CTC), Frimley Park is the home of the Combined Cadet Force (CCF) and the Army Cadet Force (ACF).

History
The House was commissioned by the Tichbourne Family in 1699. It served as a maternity hospital during the Second World War. It was subsequently used by the Officers' Association (OA), and by the Women's Royal Army Corps (WRAC), before it was handed over for use as a training college for the Cadet Forces of the British Armed Forces in 1957, opening for its first course in 1959.

Location
CTC Frimley Park is located on a large site immediately to the south west of Frimley Park Hospital, situated near Junction 4 of the M3 motorway.

Courses
The CTC Frimley Park is used primarily for the training of the cadet forces through courses.  These include:

Adult courses
Senior Officers' Course
Area Commanders' Course
SA (M) 07 Cadet
CF Adult and Leadership Management Course (ALM)
CF Skill at Arms Instructor Course
CCF Basic Course
RSMI Conference

Cadet courses
Master Cadet
Cadet Leadership Course (CLC)
Senior Cadet Conference
Note: The CTC also hosts the ACF Champion Cadet Competition.

References

Training establishments of the British Army
Educational institutions established in 1957
Education in Surrey
1957 establishments in the United Kingdom